Windy City Breakdown is the first solo album by the keyboard player and guitarist Jonathan Cain.

After this album, Cain joined The Babys.

Track listing
"Windy City Breakdown" (Jonathan Cain, J.C. Phillips) 4:18
"Lay Low Joe (Holiday On Ice)" (Cain, Phillips) 5:03
"Rock It Down" (Cain, Phillips) 4:27
"Moon Child" (Cain) 5:21
"Rollercoaster Baby" (Cain) 3:45
"Spinning My Wheels" (Cain) 4:20
"Go Now" (Larry Banks, Milton Bennett) 3:12
"Your Lady or Your Life" (Cain) 6:06
"Backseat Bernice" (single not on album)
Source:

Personnel
 Jonathan Cain - vocals, keyboards, piano, clavinet, organ
 Tommy "Mugs" Cain - drums
 Jimmy Arnold - guitars, backing vocals
 Gary Richwine - bass, backing vocals
 Ralph MacDonald, Bobbye Hall - percussion

Production
 Produced by Jonathan Cain & J.C. Phillips
 Engineered & mixed By Bert Szerlip
 Tracks 4-6 & 8 published by Blue Lick Music-Fiction Music. 
 Tracks 1-3 published by Blue Lick Music-Fiction Music/Bald Mountain Music-Fourth Floor Music.
 Track 7 published by Trio Music Co.

References

1977 debut albums
Albums produced by Jonathan Cain
Bearsville Records albums